Rossana Cecilia Surballe is an Argentine lawyer, journalist, and diplomat. She served as the ambassador of Argentina to Qatar from 2013 to 2018.

Biography
She completed a master's degree at the Latin American Social Sciences Institute, and began working as a producer at the television channel Telefe.

There she became head of the commercial economic section of the Argentine embassy. She later served as the undersecretary of foreign affairs, as part of the team of vice chancellor .

The agrément was granted by the Qatari government in April 2013, and she presented her credentials to foreign minister Khalid bin Mohammad Al Attiyah on 15 September. She became one of only six female ambassadors to the country by 2016. She remained in the position until June 2018.

This created an investment fund for US$1.3 billion, with an "offshore structure", for the administration of the ANSES . The investigation was directed by federal judge .

Judge Rafecas dismissed the aforementioned ut-supra complaint in 2017 due to the absence of a crime associated with the signing. The dismissal was confirmed by Chamber I of the Federal Court on 19 March 2018.

References

Argentine women ambassadors
Argentine women journalists
Living people
People from Mendoza, Argentina
University of Buenos Aires alumni
Year of birth missing (living people)
Ambassadors of Argentina to Qatar